FC Baník Prievidza is a Slovak football club, playing in the town of Prievidza.  Between 1993 and 2000, Prievidza played in the highest level of Slovak football, the Corgoň liga.

Following the 2006–07 season, HFK Prievidza was promoted to the Slovak First League (second level of Slovak football). The club finished in 6th place for the 2007–08 season. Beginning with the 2008–09 season, the club changed its name to FK Mesto Prievidza. In 2009–10, the club withdrew from the Slovak First League.

Club history
1919 – PAC Prievidza
1929 – ŠK Prievidza
1943 – SOHG Prievidza
1948 – Sokol Prievidza
1949 – Sokol Carpatia Prievidza
1954 – Merger of Baník Novaky and Baník Prievidza
1961 – TJ Baník Prievidza
1994 – MFK Prievidza
1995 – FK Petrimex Prievidza
1998 – FK Baník Prievidza
2003 – HFK Prievidza (resulted from the merger of MŠK TOPVAR, Horná Nitra Topoľčany and FK Baník Prievidza)
2008 – FK Mesto Prievidza
2011 – FC Baník Horná Nitra (ŠKF Baník Handlová merged with FK Prievidza 2010)
2017 – FC Baník Prievidza

Honours

Domestic
 Czechoslovakia
 1.SNL (1st Slovak National football league) (1969–1993)
  Winners (1): 1971–72

Affiliated clubs
The following clubs are currently affiliated with FC Baník Horná Nitra:
  AS Trenčín (2011–present)
  MŠK Žilina (2013–present)

Current squad
As of 23 August 2015

Notable players
Had international caps for their respective countries. Players whose name is listed in bold represented their countries while playing for Baník.

For full list, see :Category:FC Baník Prievidza players

	
 Ivan Belák	
 Karol Dobiaš	
 Karol Jokl	
 Dávid Hancko
 Filip Hlohovský
 Patrik Hrošovský	
 Martin Králik
	
 Miloš Krško	
 František Kubík
 Juraj Kucka
  Anton Malatinský
 Ján Mucha		
 Peter Németh
 Branislav Obžera
 Filip Oršula
 Ladislav Petráš
 Martin Petráš
 Martin Škrteľ
 Anton Švajlen
 Ján Vlasko
 Vladimír Weiss

Notable managers

 Milan Albrecht (2004)
 Vladimír Goffa	
 Vladimír Rusnák (2008-2009)
 Dušan Uškovič (2011-2012)
 Vladimír Ilko (2012-2014)
 Peter Černák (2014-2016)
 Juraj Pekár (2017)
 Roman Slaný (2017-208)
 Vladimir Helbich (2018-2019)
 Ján Hancko (2021-)

References

External links
 Official site 

Football clubs in Slovakia
Association football clubs established in 1919
1919 establishments in Slovakia
FC Baník Prievidza
Prievidza District
Sport in Trenčín Region